Isaac De Gois (born 24 December 1984), also known by the nickname of "Goisy", is a former Portugal international rugby league footballer.

Background
De Gois was born in Bankstown, New South Wales, Australia.

Playing career
De Gois is a Wests junior from the Liverpool area. He attended All Saints Catholic Senior College. Of Portuguese descent, De Gois made his international debut before his first-grade debut. He was selected to play for Portugal against Fiji  in October, 2005, alongside his two brothers.

2006: Career with Wests Tigers
In 2006, De Gois made his first grade debut playing for the Wests Tigers in round 3 against the New Zealand Warriors, but made only 4 other appearances for the rest of the season, due to the form of regular hooker Robbie Farah.

2007-08: Career with Cronulla
De Gois joined the Cronulla-Sutherland Sharks in 2007. He stayed with Cronulla-Sutherland for two seasons, never missing a game. He scored 10 tries in his 50 games, scoring at a rate of one try per five games.

2009-11: Career with Newcastle
In April 2008, De Gois announced that he would be playing with the Newcastle Knights from 2009 onwards, signing a deal to keep him at the club until 2011 under the guidance of coach Brian Smith, and as an immediate replacement to the departing Danny Buderus.

De Gois was one of the top tacklers of 2009. He was a vital player in the Knights fairly successful 2009 season. In the last game of the regular season, De Gois injured his left knee, and left the field in the second half. Despite doubts over his fitness, he was named to play in the qualifying final against Canterbury the next week, and re-injured his knee in the first minute of play.

2011-14: Return to Cronulla
In June 2011, De Gois signed a three-year deal with Cronulla to return to the club starting in 2012. He played in 23 games in 2012. Coach Shane Flanagan said, "I always wanted to get Isaac De Gois back to Cronulla because I knew what he could bring in terms of attitude and culture."

In his first season at back at Cronulla, the club reached the finals series but were eliminated by the Canberra Raiders.  The following year, the club again reached the finals but were defeated by rivals Manly-Warringah in the elimination semi-final.  In his final year at Cronulla, he played 9 games as the club endured a horror year on and off the field finishing last.  This was mainly due to Cronulla's injury toll and the Cronulla-Sutherland Sharks supplements saga.

2014-16: Career with Parramatta
In June 2014, De Gois joined the Parramatta Eels mid-season on a -year contract, as a replacement for Eels hooker Nathan Peats, who was ruled out for the rest of the season with an anterior cruciate ligament (ACL) knee injury.

A concussion suffered in the 2017 pre-season forced De Gois into retirement.

Love It or List It Australia
Isaac De Gois and his partner Renee were the focus of season two episode five of Love It or List It Australia.

References

External links

2014 Cronulla-Sutherland Sharks profile

1984 births
Living people
Australian rugby league players
Australian people of Portuguese descent
Central Coast Centurions players
Portugal national rugby league team players
Parramatta Eels players
Cronulla-Sutherland Sharks players
Newcastle Knights players
Nelson Bay Blues players
Rugby league hookers
Rugby league players from Sydney
Western Suburbs Magpies NSW Cup players
Wests Tigers players